Cat Johnson is a romance author who has been featured in The New York Times and USA Today. A self-proclaimed "promo ‘ho", she is known for her creative marketing and research practices. Consequently, Johnson has sponsored bull-riding rodeo cowboys, owns a collection of cowboy boots and camouflage shoes for book signings, and a number of her consultants wear combat or cowboy boots for a living. She has been a marketing manager, professional harpist, bartender, tour guide, radio show host, Junior League president, wife, and animal lover. Cat is currently contracted with Kensington Books and Samhain Publishing.

Published works by publisher

Samhain Publishing
Red, Hot & Blue series
Red Blooded
A Few Good Men
Model Soldier
A Prince Among Men
Smalltown Heat
Rough Stock
Studs in Spurs series
Unridden
Bucked
Ride
Hooked
Flanked
Thrown

Kensington

Oklahoma Nights series 
One Night with a Cowboy
Two Times as Hot
Three Weeks with a Bull Rider
He's the One (anthology)
In a Cowboy's Bed (anthology)

Ravenous Romance

A Cowboy for Christmas
Valentine Cowboys

All Romance eBooks

Texas Two-Step
Cowboy Shuffle
The Naughty Billionaire's Virgin Fiancée

Tease

Loves Immortal Pantheon series 
Erato
Eros’ Valentine
Bacchanal
Bliss

Cat Johnson
Private Lies
Olympus
Opposites Attract
Nice & Naughty
Just Desserts
BB Dalton (Red, Hot & Blue series)
8 Second Ride (Studs in Spurs series)
The Rookie (Studs in Spurs series)
New Orleans
Educating Ansley
The Ex Files
Crossing the Line
Cinderella Liberty
Beneath the Surface
Gillian's Island
The Love Bundle
Good Girls Gone Bad Bundle
Cat Snips

Cleis Press
Published by Cleis Press.
Cowboy Heat
Cowboy Lust

References

External links
 Sooner Swooner November 6, 2013 Oklahoma Gazette

American romantic fiction writers
Women romantic fiction writers
Living people
Year of birth missing (living people)